Hardstoft is a hamlet in Derbyshire, England. It is located four miles east of Clay Cross, on the B6039 road.

The Mexican Eagle Petroleum Company found small quantities of oil near Hardstoft in 1919 under encouragement from the British government.

See also
Listed buildings in Ault Hucknall

References

Hamlets in Derbyshire
Bolsover District